Gingerich is a surname of German origin. Other forms of the name are Gingrich, Gingerick and Gingery and its original form Güngerich, also written Guengerich. In Bern, Switzerland it was record as early as 1389 and in 1692 it was first recorded among Anabaptists. The first attestation in North America was in Lancaster County, Pennsylvania in 1724. The name is seldomly seen in Europe but was spread in North America by Amish and Mennonite immigrants.

Notable people with the surname include:

 Edward Gingerich (1966–2011), Amish man convicted of manslaughter
 Mose Gingerich (born 1979), Amish-born documentary-maker
 Owen Gingerich (born 1930), American astronomer
 Philip D. Gingerich (born 1946), American paleontologist

See also
 2658 Gingerich, main-belt asteroid
 Gingrich, surname
 Giegerich, surname

References